Associação Portuguesa de Desportos, commonly referred to as Portuguesa, is a Brazilian professional football club based in the district of Pari, São Paulo, that competes in the Campeonato Paulista, the top tier of the São Paulo state football league. It is part of a sports club, founded on 14 August 1920, by the Portuguese population of the city.

History

Foundation
On 14 August 1920 (the same day of the 1385 Battle of Aljubarrota), the five Paulista clubs representing the Portuguese community of São Paulo (Lusíadas Futebol Club, Portugal Marinhense, Associação Cinco de Outubro, Associação Atlética Marquês de Pombal and Esporte Club Lusitano) met at Salão da Câmara Portuguesa de Comércio to merge, and founded Associação Portuguesa de Esportes. They chose the colors of Portugal: green and red. The club merged with Mackenzie College in 1920, and was then renamed Mackenzie-Portuguesa.

The 1940s and the 1950s
In 1940, the club changed its name to Associação Portuguesa de Desportos, its current name. In 1956, Portuguesa bought from São Paulo a big piece of land located in the limits between the northeast and center of the city. In the land, the Canindé stadium was built, as well as the official headquarters, offices and social club.

Recent years

2011 Série B
In the 2011 season Portuguesa participated on the São Paulo State Championship Série A1 (first division) when they were eliminated in the Quarterfinals by São Paulo, in the Campeonato Brasileiro Série B (second division) and in the Copa do Brasil (Brazilian Cup), when they were eliminated in the First Round by Bangu.

After a comeback victory against Americana, on 22 October 2011, the club achieved promotion to Campeonato Brasileiro Série A 2012. On 8 November, after a 2–2 draw against Sport Recife, the club won the 2011 Série B, the first national title won by the club. The title crowned a strong campaign by the Lusa side, with 23 wins, 12 draws and only three defeats. The offensive and fast-paced style of play implemented by the team's coach, Jorginho, and the great amount of 82 goals scored led to the nickname of "Barcelusa", referring to FC Barcelona's style of playing. Lusa ended the 2011 Season with a 2–0 win over Icasa, finishing 21 straight games undefeated.

2012: Poor start, relegation and arrival of Dida
In 2012, the "Barcelusa" squad struggled in the Campeonato Paulista following the losses of players Marco Antonio and Edno, which led to the relegation to the Campeonato Paulista Série A2 after a 4–2 loss to Mirassol and combined results on other games. The chairman disappointment with the awful campaign in a much considered easy tournament led to the dismissal of the team's coach, Jorginho, after 14 months working for the Lusa side.

The team then turned sights on Geninho, and confirmed the former Brazilian champion as their new manager. The team mounted a good campaign in the Copa do Brasil, but fell through at the Round of 16 after a 2–0 defeat to Bahia.

Lusa started the Campeonato Brasileiro Série A with their goalkeeper Wéverton negotiating with his departure to play for Atlético Paranaense. Without a good replacement at the youth squad nor the recently added Glédson, Lusa then started negotiating with the two-time UEFA Champions League champion and former Brazil national team goalkeeper Dida, and signed the 38-year-old keeper to wear their colors until the end of the Brasileirão. The keeper started for the first time for Lusa in a match against São Paulo, and had a good showing in a 1–0 win for the Lusa side. Lusa then played against Neymar's Santos, again at home, and with amazing saves by the veteran goalkeeper and losing several clear scoring chances at the first half, the game ended 0–0, with Lusa mounting two wins, three losses and two draws starting the tournament.

Lusa then pulled off a trade with Atlético Paranaense, bringing aboard striker Bruno Mineiro. The negotiation proved to be extremely positive, since the new number 9 started scoring goals at will: in 12 games, he scored 11 times, becoming one of the top scorers in the league, pursuing closely the likes of Vagner Love, Fred and Luís Fabiano.

After twenty-seven games in the Brasileirão, Lusa survived a series of difficult games to maintain its spot out of the relegation zone. Playing against Palmeiras and Coritiba, Lusa won both games by three goals to none at home. Playing Fluminense, São Paulo, Santos and Atlético Mineiro, Lusa lost the first two games, but benefited from the absence of superstar Neymar to beat Santos away by 3–1  and then allowed Atlético Mineiro to escape out of Canindé with a draw. Despite having Brazilian international and former Ballon d'Or winner Ronaldinho, the Atlético side struggled to get out of the strong midfield pressure and ball possession imposed by Lusa, which had played the majority of the second half with a one-man advantage after defender Leonardo Silva was sent off.

Playing against Sport Club do Recife, Bruno Mineiro scored a hat-trick in a turnaround win by 5–1, becoming the new league scoring leader, trespassing Fred. Fred and Mineiro both played for América Mineiro at the youth level.

2013: Promotion back to A1, STJD issues and relegation to Série B
In December 2012, Péricles Chamusca was announced as the new manager, with a one-year contract. He was fired in April 2013. A day after Chamusca's dismissal, the club announced a Colonel, Edson Pimenta, as new coach.

On April 16, 2013, Portuguesa was eliminated by Naviraiense in 2013 Copa do Brasil's first round. Only nine days later, Lusa won promotion to Campeonato Paulista Série A1, after a 2–1 victory against Capivariano.

Although Portuguesa finished the championship just above the relegation positions (precisely in 12th), it was punished by the Superior Court of Sport Justice for irregularly calling in a player during a match against Grêmio – Héverton, who was suspended for a red card received at his previous Copa do Brasil match. With the punishment, the team lost four points – three for the irregular usage of a player and a fourth one which the team won due to the game resulting in a tie – and ended up being relegated. This way, Fluminense managed to finish the championship above the relegation positions and was spared from having to compete in the next year's second division for the third time on the last 2 decades.

2014: Late reaction in Paulistão, another relegation
On 10 January 2014, a supporter from the club won a lawsuit in São Paulo's courts, which determines the points would be returned to Portuguesa, relegating Fluminense. However, CBF refused to accept the lawsuit, and published the 2014 Série A table without Lusa, placing the club in Série B instead.

In 2014 Campeonato Paulista, Lusa was placed in the Group C, with Santos, Ponte Preta, São Bernardo and Paulista. The club failed to win in their first five games, and saw Guto Ferreira's resignation as manager. Under Argel Fucks, the club fared better and finished fourth in the group, only four points behind second-placed Ponte.

In April, the club was again knocked out of Copa do Brasil, this time by lowly Potiguar Mossoró; also in the same month, the club left the pitch in the 16th minute of a match against Joinville, and was later punished by STJD due to disbandment.

Argel left Lusa in the following month, and after short-reign terms of Marcelo Veiga and Silas, the club announced the arrival of Vágner Benazzi in mid-September, highly known for his abilities to guide a team out of the relegation places. However, he was also dismissed in the following month, after failing to achieve a single win. During that time, the club also saw a host of players coming and going out, with the squad surpassing the 40 players mark.

Portuguesa was relegated to Série C (for the first time in the club's history) on the 28th of October, after losing 0–3 to Oeste.

2015–2016: Série C and Série A2
Portuguesa started the 2015 Paulistão with a win, defeating Ponte Preta by 3–2. On 4 March 2015 the club reached the second stage of Copa do Brasil, after a 3–1 away win against Santos-AP.

On 20 March, after being highly pressured, president Ilídio Lico resigned and was replaced by Jorge Manuel Marques Gonçalves. Two weeks later, the club was again relegated to Série A2, after a 0–3 away loss against São Paulo.

During the year's Série C, Portuguesa qualified to the final rounds as second in its group, but missed out promotion after losing to eventual champions Vila Nova. The following year, the club narrowly avoided relegation in Série A2 after finishing 13th.

Portuguesa suffered another relegation in the end of the 2016 season, after a 0–2 away loss against Tombense, being demoted to Série D ahead of the 2017 campaign.

2017–: Série D, non-division and Copa Paulista title
Ahead of the 2017 season, Portuguesa announced Émerson Leão as their football consultant, with Tuca Guimarães being appointed as manager. With subsequent managers Estevam Soares and Mauro Fernandes, the club was knocked out in the first phase of the year's Série D, and also reached the semifinals of the Copa Paulista, meaning that the club was not included in any national division for the 2018 season.

During the 2018 campaign, Lusa had Guilherme Alves and Allan Aal as their managers, finishing in both disappointing mid-table positions in the Série A2 and in the Copa Paulista. In the 2019 season, the first team was managed by Luís Carlos Martins, Vica and former youth graduate Zé Maria, again with little success.

Moacir Júnior started the 2020 campaign as manager, but was sacked in February. Another youth graduate, Fernando Marchiori, was named in his place, and led the club to the quarterfinals of the Série A2. In the Copa Paulista, the club lifted the trophy for the first time in their history, only losing one match in the entire competition and having the second-best defensive records of the tournament's history; the title also ensured Portuguesa back in a national tournament after three years of absence.

In the 2021 Campeonato Brasileiro Série D, Portuguesa led their group but was knocked out of the tournament on penalties by Caxias. This led to the departure of Marchiori as manager, and another former player of the club, Alex Alves, took over.

On 9 April 2022, under the guidance of Sérgio Soares, Lusa achieved promotion to the Campeonato Paulista after seven years.

Honours
Campeonato Brasileiro Série A:
Runner-up (1): 1996

Campeonato Brasileiro Série B: 1
2011

São Paulo State Championship: 3
1935, 1936, 1973

Campeonato Paulista Série A2:3
2007, 2013, 2022

Rio-São Paulo Tournament: 2
1952, 1955

São Paulo Youth Cup (Copa São Paulo de Futebol Júnior): 2
1991, 2002

Campeonato Brasileiro de Futebol Feminino: 1
1999-00

Campeonato Paulista Feminino de Futebol: 2
1998, 2000

Copa Paulista: 1
2020

Rivals
During its time in the Serie A and state championships, Portuguesa has had run-ins with Corinthians, Palmeiras, São Paulo, Íbis and Juventus.

Stadium

Portuguesa's stadium is the Estádio do Canindé, built in 1956, with a maximum capacity of 27,500. Following current FIFA safety rules, the maximum capacity is 25,470 people.

Logo history

The club's first logo was introduced on 14 August 1920, during the club's foundation, was a Portuguese shield. This logo was chosen to honor Portugal.

The club's second logo, introduced in 1923, had a Cross of Avis bordered by a red outline. The Cross of Avis represents Portuguese independence from the Kingdom of Castille, which happened after the Battle of Aljubarrota on August 14, 1385.

In 2005, the club's logo design was modernized, and golden trim was added around the red outline.

In 2015, Portuguesa returned to the badge used between 1923 and 2005.

Team colors

Portuguesa's first kit, introduced on 20 September 1920, was an all-red shirt, white shorts, and red socks with two horizontal green lines. The goalkeeper kit was completely white.

On 26 March 1923, the club's kit was changed to red and green vertically striped shirts.

The team kit was later changed again, with the red and green stripes changed to horizontal ones, and the away kit became an all-white shirt, red shorts and red socks.

Mascots

Portuguesa's first mascot was a Portuguese girl named Severa. She was named after the 1930s fado singer Dima Tereza who was nicknamed A Severa, after the Portuguese fado singer Maria Severa Onofriana.

In 1994, Portuguesa changed its mascot. The club's unique original mascot was replaced by a lion wearing the club's home kit. The lion is one of the most common Brazilian football club's mascots.

Anthems

There are two club's anthems. The first anthem, called Hino Rubro-verde (Portuguese for Red and Green Anthem) is the old one, and was composed by Archimedes Messina and Carlos Leite Guerra.

The second anthem, called Campeões (Portuguese for Champions) is the current club's anthem, and was composed by Roberto Leal and Márcia Lúcia.

Current squad

First-team squad

Youth team

Out on loan

Managers

 Otto Glória (1973–75)
 Candinho (1997–99)
 Mário Zagallo (1999–2000)
 Candinho (2001–02)
 Heriberto da Cunha (2003)
 Paulo Comelli (2004)
 Alexandre Gallo (2005)
 Giba (2005–06)
 Candinho (2006)
 Vágner Benazzi (2006–08)
 Estevam Soares (2008–09)
 Mário Sérgio (2009)
 Paulo Bonamigo (2009)
 Renê Simões (2009)
 Vágner Benazzi (2009–10)
 Vadão (2010)
 Sérgio Guedes (2010–11)
 Jorginho (2011–12)
 Geninho (2012)
 Péricles Chamusca (2012–13)
 Guto Ferreira (2013–14)
 Argel Fucks (2014)
 Marcelo Veiga (2014)
 Silas Pereira (2014)
 Vágner Benazzi (2014)
 Ailton Silva (2014–15)
 Júnior Lopes (2015)
 Estevam Soares (2015)
 Anderson Beraldo (2016)
 Jorginho (2016)
 Márcio Ribeiro (2016)
 Tuca Guimarães (2017)
 Estevam Soares (2017)
 Mauro Fernandes (2017)
 PC Gusmão (2017)
 Guilherme Alves (2018)
 Allan Aal (2018)
 Luís Carlos Martins (2019)
 Vica (2019)
 Zé Maria (2019)
 Moacir Júnior (2020)
 Fernando Marchiori (2020–21)
 Alex Alves (2021)
 Sérgio Soares (2022)
 Mazola Júnior (2023)
 Gilson Kleina (2023–)

Notable players

See also
 List of Associação Portuguesa de Desportos statistics

References

Lusa, uma História de Amor – Orlando Duarte, Livraria Teixeira, 2000.

External links
 Official website
 Portuguesa at Facebook
 Portuguesa at YouTube
 Portuguesa at Twitter
 Portuguesa at Instagram
 Portuguesa at TikTok

 
Association football clubs established in 1920
Multi-sport clubs in Brazil
Portuguese-Brazilian culture
1920 establishments in Brazil
Diaspora football clubs in Brazil